Burke's Law is an American detective series that aired on ABC from 1963 to 1966. The show starred Gene Barry as millionaire captain of Los Angeles Police homicide division Amos Burke, who is chauffeured around to solve crimes in his 1962 Rolls-Royce Silver Cloud II complete with an early car phone.

The original series was converted into a spy drama, Amos Burke Secret Agent, in its third and final season.  The series was revived in 1994–1995 on CBS, with Barry reprising the role of the millionaire detective.

Premise
The show shares stylistic similarities with Barry's previous series, Bat Masterson, in which he played a debonair lawman of the Old West. During the opening credits, as the title flashes onscreen, a woman's voice seductively pronounces the words "It's Burke's Law!"  The title also reflects Burke's habit of dispensing wisdom to his underlings in a professorial manner, e.g., "Never ask a question unless you already know the answer. Burke's Law."

The anomaly of a millionaire police captain is explained in a first episode conversation between Detective Tim Tilson and a potential witness. Told that Amos Burke is Head of the Homicide Division and a millionaire, the witness asks: "Why a cop?"
 A variant is repeated in the 1994 revival.

The title of each episode begins with the words "Who Killed...?" with the name or description of the victim (who invariably dies or is found dead in the show's opening minutes) completing it. Five or six "special guest stars"  comprise the list of suspects. Burke is then driven to the crime scene in his Rolls-Royce by his loyal chauffeur, Henry.

Burke is an eligible bachelor whose dates with various gorgeous women are often interrupted by calls to begin a new case. He can be—though rarely—distracted by an alluring woman, and is often the object of much female interest.

Burke is assisted by Detective Tim Tilson (Gary Conway), Detective Sergeant Les Hart (Regis Toomey), and chauffeur Henry (Philippine actor Leon Lontoc). Two recurring characters were coroner George McLeod/McCloud (Michael Fox) and desk sergeant Gloria Ames (Eileen O'Neill).

Tilson is a brilliant, thorough young detective whose skill at finding clues and tracing references results in his "almost" solving the crime, only to be outflanked by Burke's cool intuition and years of experience. Les Hart is a no-nonsense, seen-it-all veteran (perhaps a nod to Toomey's numerous roles as cops in feature films) who has known Burke for years, while Henry often provides comic relief. The characters share a team camaraderie reflected in mild jokes about each other's foibles.

Spin-off
Actress Anne Francis, who appears in season-one episode "Who Killed Wade Walker?" and as female private detective Honey West in season-two episode "Who Killed the Jackpot?", starred in the 30-episode spin-off Honey West TV series. (See also Burke's Law (1994 TV series) episode 3, "Who Killed Nick Hazard?").

History
The role of Amos Burke actually antedated Barry's series, having been played by Dick Powell in "Who Killed Julie Greer?," the initial episode of The Dick Powell Show in September 1961. The first incarnation of the series was produced by Powell's company, Four Star Television.  As in the later series, the episode features several well-known TV and movie stars in cameo appearances as suspects – one of whom is the murderer (in the original Dick Powell episode Ronald Reagan played one of the suspects). Leon Lontoc was the only cast member of the episode to reprise his role in the later series.

In the final season of the original series (1965–1966), the show was given a complete overhaul and retitled Amos Burke Secret Agent.  Burke went to work for a secret government agency, but still drove around in his Rolls, which had been discreetly bulletproofed by the agency. The supporting cast of the earlier seasons was dropped, as was the heavy use of celebrity cameos. The change in format was a reaction to the wildly popular spy trend inspired by the James Bond films and the television success of The Man from U.N.C.L.E.; 1965 also saw the debuts of I Spy, The Wild Wild West, and Get Smart. The new show was not a success and only 17 episodes were broadcast instead of the 32 of the first two seasons.

As of 2010, the Rolls-Royce used in the original 1963 series was owned by a collector in Palm Beach, Florida.

Cast

Main
 Gene Barry as Capt. Amos Burke
 Gary Conway as Det. Tim Tilson (seasons 1–2)
 Regis Toomey as Det. Sgt. Les Hart (seasons 1–2)
 Leon Lontoc as Henry (seasons 1–2)

Recurring
 Eileen O'Neill as Sgt. Ames (seasons 1–2)
 Michael Fox, as Coroner George McCleod/McCloud (seasons 1–2)
 Carl Benton Reid as The Man (season 3: Amos Burke Secret Agent)

Regulars
In addition, a number of actors appeared regularly in various roles through seasons 1 and 2:

 June Kim variously as "girl/housegirl/maid" (season 1)
 Don Gazzaniga as policemen (seasons 1–2)
 Bob Bice, bit parts (seasons 1–2)
 Paul Dubov, bit parts; wrote various episodes (seasons 1–2)
 Hy Averback, bit parts; directed various episodes (season 1)
 Army Archerd as himself/bit parts (seasons 1–2)

Guest stars (partial list)
 
In alphabetical order:

Eddie Albert, June Allyson, Don Ameche, Mary Astor, Frankie Avalon, Ed Begley, William Bendix, Joan Blondell, Ann Blyth, Hoagy Carmichael, Rory Calhoun, John Cassavetes, Dick Clark, Jeanne Crain, Broderick Crawford, Arlene Dahl, Sammy Davis Jr.,  Linda Darnell, Laraine Day, Yvonne DeCarlo, William Demarest, Andy Devine, Diana Dors, Joanne Dru, Dan Duryea, Barbara Eden, Nanette Fabray, Felicia Farr, Rhonda Fleming, Nina Foch, Anne Francis, Annette Funicello, Eva Gabor, Zsa Zsa Gabor, Gloria Grahame, Jane Greer, Tammy Grimes, George Hamilton, Phil Harris, June Havoc, Richard Haydn, Celeste Holm, Oscar Homolka, Edward Everett Horton, Rodolfo Hoyos Jr., Tab Hunter, Betty Hutton, Martha Hyer, Carolyn Jones, Buster Keaton, Eartha Kitt, Frankie Laine, Fernando Lamas, Dorothy Lamour, Elsa Lanchester, Lauren Lane, Gypsy Rose Lee, Ida Lupino, Tina Louise, Paul Lynde, Jayne Mansfield, Marilyn Maxwell, Virginia Mayo, Burgess Meredith, Una Merkel, Dina Merrill, Vera Miles, Sal Mineo, Ricardo Montalbán, Elizabeth Montgomery, Agnes Moorehead, Rita Moreno, Sheree North, Susan Oliver, Janis Paige, Fess Parker, Suzy Parker, Bert Parks, Walter Pidgeon, Zasu Pitts, Juliet Prowse, Basil Rathbone,  Aldo Ray, Martha Raye, Carl Reiner, Don Rickles, Ruth Roman, Cesar Romero, Mickey Rooney, Gena Rowlands, Janice Rule, Soupy Sales, Telly Savalas, Lizabeth Scott, William Shatner, Nancy Sinatra, Jan Sterling, Jill St. John, Gale Storm, Susan Strasberg, Gloria Swanson, Terry-Thomas, Miyoshi Umeki, Mamie van Doren, James Whitmore, Michael Wilding, Chill Wills, Ed Wynn,  Keenan Wynn.

Episodes

Music
The musical score for Burke's Law was largely the work of Herschel Burke Gilbert, who also wrote the show's theme, although Richard Shores and Joseph Mullendore also composed scores. Gilbert's theme was rearranged for Amos Burke, Secret Agent.

Home media
The following DVD sets of Burke's Law have been released by VCI Entertainment.

VCI released the complete first season on April 5, 2016.

1994 revival series

In the revival of the show, which ran on CBS from 1994 to 1995, the title was again Burke's Law. In the 1994 version, Burke was back at work as a police detective, though now as a deputy chief instead of a captain, and was assisted by his son, Peter (Peter Barton). The revival was produced by Aaron Spelling's production company, Spelling Productions.

References

External links

 
 
 

1963 American television series debuts
1966 American television series endings
American Broadcasting Company original programming
Black-and-white American television shows
Fictional portrayals of the Los Angeles Police Department
Television series by Four Star Television
Television series by 20th Century Fox Television
American television series revived after cancellation
Television shows set in Los Angeles
American detective television series